The Unwanted is a 1924 British silent drama film directed by Walter Summers and starring C. Aubrey Smith, Lillian Hall-Davis and Nora Swinburne.

Cast
 C. Aubrey Smith as Colonel Carrington  
 Lillian Hall-Davis as Maraine Dearsley  
 Nora Swinburne as Joyce Mannering 
 Francis Lister as John Dearsley  
 Walter Sondes as Kenneth Carrington  
 Mary Dibley as Genevieve

References

Bibliography
 Harris, Ed. Britain's Forgotten Film Factory: The Story of Isleworth Studios. Amberley Publishing, 2013.

External links

1924 films
British drama films
British silent feature films
1924 drama films
1920s English-language films
Films directed by Walter Summers
Films shot at Isleworth Studios
Films set in England
British black-and-white films
Silent drama films
1920s British films